Brusqeulia atrograpta is a species of moth of the family Tortricidae. It is found in Minas Gerais, Brazil.

The wingspan is about 12 mm. The ground colour of the forewings is white and the markings are black. The hindwings are grey, but whiter basally and mixed with black on the periphery.

Etymology
The specific name refers to the forewing colouration and is said to be derived from Greek ater (meaning black) and graptos (meaning written, painted). In explaining another epithet in the same article, Razowski and Becker, label the word ater as Latin. In ancient Greek, ater is not attested, while in classical Latin, ater means "black".

References

Moths described in 2011
Brusqeulia
Moths of South America
Taxa named by Józef Razowski